This is a list of episodes for the anime Akikan! Each episode features the word  in its title, playing as a pun of the show's nature.

Akikan!